The 1962 California Golden Bears football team was an American football team that represented the University of California, Berkeley in the Athletic Association of Western Universities (AAWU) during the 1962 NCAA University Division football season. In its fourth year under head coach Marv Levy, the team compiled a 1–9 record (0–4 against AAWU opponents), finished in last place in the AAWU, and was outscored by its opponents by a combined total of 247 to 143.

The team's statistical leaders included Craig Morton with 905 passing yards, Alan Nelson with 334 rushing yards, and Bill Turner with 537 receiving yards. Morton was later inducted into the College Football Hall of Fame.

Schedule

Roster

References

California
California Golden Bears football seasons
California Golden Bears football